Myitkyina ((Eng; mitchinar) Jinghpaw: Myitkyina) is the capital city of Kachin State in Myanmar (Burma), located  from Yangon, and  from Mandalay. In Burmese it means "near the big river", and Myitkyina is on the west bank of the Ayeyarwady River, just below  from Myit-son (Burmese for confluence) of its two headstreams (the Mali and N'mai rivers). It is the northernmost river port and railway terminus in Myanmar. The city is served by Myitkyina Airport.

History
Myitkyina has been an important trading town between China and Myanmar since ancient times.

American Baptist missionary George J. Geis and his wife arrived in Myitkyina in the late 1890s and in 1900 they requested permission to build a mansion in the town. The building was named Geis Memorial Church. It is one of the Kachin Baptist Convention (KBC) churches in Myitkyina.

Japanese forces captured the town and nearby airbase during World War II in 1942. In August 1944, Myitkyina was recaptured by the Allied forces under General Joseph Stilwell after a prolonged siege and heavy fighting between Nationalist Chinese divisions, the Chindits, and Merrill's Marauders of the Northern Combat Area Command and the besieged elements of the 33rd Imperial Japanese Army under General Masaki Honda. The town was strategically important not only because of its rail and water links to the rest of Burma, but also because it was on the planned route of the Ledo Road.

Climate
Myitkyina has a borderline tropical monsoon climate (Köppen Am) bordering upon both a tropical savanna climate (Aw) and a humid subtropical climate (Cwa). Temperatures are very warm throughout the year, although the winter months from December to February are milder. There is a winter dry season from November to April and a summer wet season from May to October.

Air quality
The city residents dispose of the majority of their waste by burning it in small piles by the roadside. Most waste is disposed in this way, including plastics. Almost every block in the city has one small fire every evening. Burning usually starts late-afternoon, and by 6.00pm the city air is often quite smoky. Burning can start earlier at the weekend. The air quality in Myitkyina in the evenings can be poor, which can make being outside unpleasant. Sometimes, due to atmospheric pressure, the air will still be smoky in the morning. The only time of year that this does not happen is during the monsoon season, when it is reported that the air is fresh.

Population

As the capital of the state, it has government offices, and a greater population than other cities in the state. The city has a population of approximately 150,000, with a mix of Kachin, Shan, Bamar, Burmese Gorkha and some Chinese and Indians.

The Kachin language is the common language among the Kachin. Some people can speak English and Nepali while the town's people mostly speak in Burmese which is the national language of Myanmar.

Foreigners are now free to visit Myitkyina without prior government permission.

Religion
Major religions are Theravada Buddhism, Christianity (Roman Catholic and Baptist are major denominations), and other religions such as animism, Hinduism and Islam.

Economy 

Myitkyina is the business center of Kachin State, with many natural resources like jade, gold, amber and teak, as well as wood and agricultural products. As per government data, almost US$2 billion in jade were exported yearly in 2010 and 2011  Now, due to fighting between Kachin Independence Army rebels and the government, most businesses in the region have gone down.

Transportation

Myitkyina Airport is the main airport serving the city. It connects the cities of Putao, Mandalay and also Lashio on Mondays.

It takes almost 24 hours to go from Mandalay to Myitkyina by train. The railway has been used for 100 years. This railway is a major method of transportation for both farmers and traders to deliver goods. It also connects Laiza, Bhamo, China, and Sumprabum by car.

The Myitkyina-Tanai-India road, also known as the Ledo Road, was constructed by the British.

Education 
The city is home to Myitkyina University, a Christian theological seminary, a college for teachers, a training school for nurses, a college for the study of computers and other rare type of colleges affiliated with several seminaries in the United States and Asia, notably Kachin Theological College and Seminary(KTCS)-Nawng Nang. It is also home to the branch I.L.B.C. (International Language Business Center) a chain of private schools for English learners in the Myanmar. It has also many non-government institutions such as Naushawng development institute, Pinnya Tagar, Ningshawng and Kachinland School of Arts & Sciences, which has a University vision in 2024. 

Computer University, Myitkyina
Myitkyina University
Myitkyina Education College
Technological University, Myitkyina

Healthcare

Public hospitals 
 Myitkyina General Hospital
 Myitkyina Narcotic Hospital

Military 
Northern SOC (HQ at Myitkyina)
Nanpong / Nanpong Air Base headquarters (formerly 503 Air Base)

See also

Notes

External links

Satellite Map of Myitkyina from Google Map
Kachin State map Asterism
http://www.kachinstate.com
http://www.infoplease.com/ce6/world/A0834638.html

 
World War II sites in Burma
Township capitals of Myanmar
Populated places in Kachin State
Irrawaddy River